Ahmad Beladi Behbahani is a refugee who claimed to be a former Iranian intelligence officer, responsible for organizing terrorism abroad. He is known for his claim in 2000 that the Iranian government planned and sanctioned the Lockerbie disaster, when Pan Am Flight 103 crashed on December 21, 1988, over the town of Lockerbie in Annandale, Scotland. He reportedly alleged that Iran carried out the act in response to the destruction of Iran Air Flight 655 on July 3, 1988. The claim was made while he was a refugee in Turkey. Behbahani claimed that he brought into Iran a group of Libyans who underwent 90 days of training to prepare them to carry out the bombing.

References

External links
 "Iranian defector claims Tehran planned Lockerbie bombing, '60 Minutes' reports" (cnn) 
 "Iran denies defector's terror claims; U.S. also doubts story" (cnn) 
 "Iran blamed for Lockerbie bomb" (bbc)
 "Lockerbie: Conspiracy theories"
 "Intelligence sources say behbahani could be genuine but…" (Iran Press Service) 

Year of birth missing (living people)
People of the Ministry of Intelligence (Iran)
Pan Am Flight 103
Iranian refugees
Living people
People from Behbahan